Hope Great House is a national park on Crooked Island, the Bahamas. The park is the site of a former plantation house.

References

National parks of the Bahamas